Ananda Dev Bhatta (October 1936 – 30 August 2021) was a Nepali literaturist and politician, belonging to the Communist Party of Nepal (Unified Marxist-Leninist). He was the President of the Progressive Writers' Movement.

Education 
Bhatta completed his Master's degree in English Literature in 1960 in Patna University, India. He received his post-graduate diploma from The University of Leeds in West Yorkshire, England in 1982. He received his Master's in Education degree from The University of London in 1983.

Bhatta contested the 1999 election in the Baitadi-2 constituency, coming second with 7611 votes.

References

1936 births
2021 deaths
Marxist writers
Communist Party of Nepal (Unified Marxist–Leninist) politicians
Neurological disease deaths in Nepal
Deaths from Alzheimer's disease
People from Jumla District
Nepalese writers
Nepali-language writers
20th-century Nepalese writers
21st-century Nepalese writers